Brinkhill is a village and civil parish in the East Lindsey district of Lincolnshire, England.

The village is listed in 1086 Domesday Book as "Brincle", with 26 households which was then considered quite large. The Lord of the Manor was Earl Hugh of Chester.

The parish church is dedicated to Saint Philip and is a Grade II listed building dating from 1857, built of red brick by Maugham and Fowler. In the churchyard stands an ancient scheduled and Grade II* listed churchyard cross, the base of which dates from the 14th century, with a 19th-century alteration.

The Greenwich Prime Zero meridian line passes through the village.

References

External links

Villages in Lincolnshire
Civil parishes in Lincolnshire
East Lindsey District